Wisconsin Conservatory of Lifelong Learning (WCLL) is a Milwaukee Public Schools district school in Milwaukee, Wisconsin. It is located at 1017 North 12th Street.

Website
Wisconsin Conservatory of Lifelong Learning website

Education in Milwaukee